Timpany Senior Secondary School is a Christian mission school in the city of Visakhapatnam, Andhra Pradesh, India. It was founded in 1931 during the Indian pre-independence era by Dr. Rev. A.W. Timpany of the Canadian Baptist Mission with his objective of serving the cause of education for the glory of God. It is managed by the Evangelical Trust Association of South India (ETASI). Aruldass Gnanamuthu is the current Chairman of Timpany Schools. The medium of instruction for the school is English. They are run on Christian principles and offer students a complete education of body, mind and spirit.

References 

 

Christian schools in Andhra Pradesh
Education in Visakhapatnam
Educational institutions established in 1931
Schools in Visakhapatnam district
Convention of Baptist Churches of Northern Circars
Uttarandhra
1931 establishments in India